The Bush Cinderella is a 1928 New Zealand film starring Dale Austen, the second Miss New Zealand.

It was filmed in and around Auckland in 1928.

Cast

References

External links

The Bush Cinderella at New Zealand Film Festival
 Poster of the film by the Film Archive of New Zealand

1928 films
1920s New Zealand films
New Zealand silent films
1920s English-language films